Hon. Jagannath Shankarsheth Murkute (also spelled as Jugonnath Sunkersett), popularly known as Nana Shankarsheth (10 February 1803 – 31 July 1865) was an Indian Philanthropist and Educationalist. He was born in 1803 in the wealthy Murkute family in Murbad,Thane. So high was his credit that Arabs, Afghans and other foreign merchants chose to place their treasures in his custody rather than with banks. He soon acquired a large fortune, much of which he donated to the public.

Personal life 
Jagannath Shankar Murkute was born on 10 February 1803 at Murbad in a Marathi family . He is well known as Jagannath ShankarSheth. His father Shankar Murkute had a business of jewellery and diamonds. He was from Daivadnya Brahmin community. His father earned lots of money in this business, thats why he was known as Shankar Sheth (A Wealthy man). 

In 1861 he was a member of Bombay presidency assembly. In 1862 he became the adviser of governor of Bombay presidency.

Social and Educational Work 

Shankarsheth became an active leader in many arenas of life in  Mumbai. Foreseeing the need for improvements in education. He opened the first ever school for girl child in Mumbai.  He became one of the founders of the School Society and the Native School of Bombay, the first of its kind in Western India. The school went through a series of name changes: in 1824, it became the Bombay Native Institution, in 1840, the Board of Education, and in 1856 the name which continues to this day, the Elphinstone Educational Institution. It is the same institution where, the well known, Balshashtri Jambhekar, Dadabhai Nauroji, Mahadev Govind Ranade, Ramakrishna Gopal Bhandarkar were the students during Nana's period. Later, even Gopal Krishna Gokhale, Lokmanya Tilak had attended the Elphinstone College for studies. When the Students' Literary and Scientific Society first opened their girls' schools, Jagannath Shankarsheth contributed much of the necessary funds, despite strong opposition of some members of the Hindu community. Other educational projects he began include the English School, the Sanskrit Seminary, and the Sanskrit Library, all of which are located in Girgaon, South Mumbai. 

He donated his hundreds of acres land for development of Mumbai. He established many educational institutions in it. He was one of the founders of Bombay Native Education Society, it was the first education institute in western India. By Shankarsheth's efforts the Haind Shala and School book society got founded in 1822. Later this institute got transformed into Bombay native education society. Due to his works he is known as sculpturer of Mumbai.

Development Works 
In 1845, along with Sir Jamsetjee Jeejeebhoy, he formed the Indian Railway Association to bring railways in India. It was his idea and efforts to start Railways in India according to which he had discussed the proposals with Govt of that time. Eventually, the association evolved into the Great Indian Peninsula Railway, and Jeejee bhoy and ShankarSheth became the only two Indians among the ten directors of the GIP railways. As a director, Nana Shankarsheth participated in the very first train which started on 16th April 1853 in India between Mumbai and Thane, which took approximately 45 minutes.

Jagannath Shankarsheth, Sir George Birdwood and Dr Bhau Daji were instrumental in some of the major reconstruction efforts of the city, beginning 1857. The three gradually changed a town made up of a close network of streets into a spacious and airy city, adorned with fine avenues and splendid buildings. He became the first Indian to be nominated to the Legislative Council of Mumbai under the Act of 1861, and became a member of the Bombay Board of Education. He also was the first Indian member of the Asiatic Society of Mumbai, and is known to have endowed a school and donated land in Grant Road for a theater. His influence was used by Sir John Malcolm to induce the Hindus to acquiesce in the suppression of suttee or widow-burning, and his efforts also paid off after the Hindu community was granted a cremation ground at Sonapur. He is known to have donated generously to Hindu temples. During the First War of Independence of 1857, the British suspected his involvement, but acquitted him due to lack of evidence. He died in Mumbai on 31 July 1865. A year after his death a marble statue was erected at the Asiatic Society of Mumbai. Erstwhile Girgaon Road and chowk (Nana Chowk) at Grant Road are named after him in South Mumbai.

The Bombay Association was the first political organization in Mumbai founded by Jagannath Shankarsheth on 26 August 1852. Various members were Sir Jamshedji Jejeebhoy, Jagannath Shankarsheth, Naoroji Furdunji, Dr. Bhau Daji Lad, Dadabhai Naoroji and Vinayak Shankarshet. Sir Jamshedji Jejibhai was the first president of the organization.

Family History 
Jagannath's ancestor Babulsheth Ganbasheth migrated to Mumbai in the mid-18th century from Konkan. Babulsheth's son Shankarsheth was a prominent businessman of South Mumbai in the late-18th century. Gunbow Street (now called Rustom Sidhwa Marg) in the Fort business district of Mumbai, is named after Ganbasheth, and not, as many people assume, is of military origin.

Descendents of Nana still look after the family estate as well as the family temple at Nana Chowk.

Philanthropy 
The Dr. Bhau Daji Lad Museum, at Byculla in Mumbai which was designed by a famous London architect was built with the patronage of many wealthy Indian businessmen and philanthropists like Jagannath, David Sassoon and Sir Jamsetjee Jejeebhoy.

The Bhavani-Shankar Mandir and The Ram Mandir near Nana Chowk were built by Shankarsheth Babulsheth in the early-19th century and are currently in the possession of the Shankarsheth family.

Bibliography 

 Bharatcha pahila rashtrapurush  Na. Jagannath Shankarsheth by Dr.Madhav R. Potadar.

References

Further reading

  Jagannath Shankar Shet, Mumbai Meri Jaan, Mumbai News, World Press, 30 January 2008.
  Who was Hon. Jugonnath Sunkersett?; Manoj Nair; Mumbai Mirror; Thursday, 9 March 2006; pg 8.

1800 births
1865 deaths
Konkani people
Businesspeople from Mumbai
Founders of Indian schools and colleges
Indian people in rail transport
Members of the Bombay Legislative Council
19th-century Indian philanthropists